Henry Bosch AO (born 20 January 1931) is an Australian businessman, CEO, Chairman and Governance advocate. He has worked to increase standards of corporate governance, leading to his authorship of such reports as the 1991 Bosch Report: “Corporate Practices and Conduct”, The Workings of a Watchdog and The Director at Risk – Accountability in the Boardroom.

He studied at Sydney and Oxford Universities and at the Centre d’Etudes Industrielles in Geneva. He resided at Wesley College while studying at Sydney University. He spent his initial career in the manufacturing sector in the aluminum, steel, man-made fibres and plastics industries in Switzerland, Canada, the United Kingdom and Australia.

He has held over 30 directorships including the following companies:

 Company Director of John Lysaght 1972,
 Managing Director of Nylex Corporation 1980,
 President of the Plastics Institute,
 Chairman of the Chemicals and Plastics Industry Council.
 Bosch committee in 1995.

He was appointed an Officer of the Order of Australia in 1991 for services to industry, commerce and government. He was awarded the John Story Medal by the Australian Institute of Management Education and Training in the same year.

He is currently Adjunct Professor in the School of Management at RMIT University.

Bibliography
 (1986). ''Shareholder's Rights -

References 

Australian businesspeople
1931 births
Living people
Officers of the Order of Australia